The Colchester Vase is an ancient Roman British vase made from local clay from Colchester, England dating to 175 AD, depicting a gladiator battle between two individuals: Memnon and Valentinus, which are believed to be stage names.

It was discovered in a Roman-era grave in 1853, which held the deceased's cremated remains.

It has currently held by the Colchester Castle Museum collection, and is renowned to be among the finest piece of Roman-British pottery.

Description 
The vase measures a diameter of 17.5 cm and a height of 22.5 cm, weighs 1 kilogram and is made of coarse local clay. It is a variant of Ancient Roman pottery, called black ware, which is primarily used for storage or culinary usage. Of which, the vase derives either from Durobrivian or Castor Ware. The vase was discovered in 1853 in West Lodge road by local antiquarian John Taylor, who then donated it to the Colchester Castle Museum. The vase contained the cremated remains of a 40+ year old, non-local resident.

Initially presumed to be an export abroad Britain thanks to the sophisticated attention to the figures on the vase, a 2023 analysis of the vase indicates a local origin, in addition to revealing the extant of gladiator battles in the outskirts of the Roman Empire. In addition, the text on the vase is noted to be etched in while the clay was soft before being baked in the kiln.

Roman Colchester (Colonia Claudia Victricensis), or Camulodunum, is renowned to be a center of pottery production during the 3rd century, with 40 documented kilns in the town.

Imagery 
Camulodunum is noted to be a major hub of Roman Britain, boasting public recreational structures including two Roman theaters to which the gladiator battle could have taken place. A similar jar, now housed in the British Museum, attests to such recreational activities in the city.

The jar is decorated with a three different scenes, relating to the different recreational activities present during the time. The inscription of the vase reads:'Secundus (and) Mario'/'Memnon the secutor (victor) nine (times)'/'Valentinu(s) of the Thirtieth Legion'The first scene depicts animal-animal fighting, with a dog chasing two deer and a hare.

The second scene depicts the bestiarius, the animal hunting spectacle, with venators named Secundus and Mario fighting a bear. Mario is a dative of "Marius", and that the location of the names do not specifically tag or identify the beast-fighting figures.

The second scene depicts the gladiator battle of two men: Memnon, a secutor and Valentinus, a retiarius. The text identifies Valentinus as a member of the Legio XXX Ulpia Victrix, though it is noted that the Legio XXX was not based in Britain, but rather in Germania Superior, in present day Xanten. Memnon is labelled as the victor of the match, with "VIIII" indicating this is his ninth victory, with Valentinus depicted as raising his finger in defeat. Memnon, a reference to the mythical Ethiopian king in the Trojan War, is believed to be a stage name for the winning fighter, and also extant evidence of Roman residents of African descent in the area.

References 

Gladiatorial combat
Romano-British pottery
Roman Colchester
1853 archaeological discoveries